This is a list of airports that America West Express was serving at the time of the merger of America West Airlines with US Airways in October 2007:

Canada 
  Calgary, Alberta (Calgary International Airport)
  Edmonton, Alberta (Edmonton International Airport)
  Vancouver, B.C. (Vancouver International Airport)

Mexico
Guadalajara (Don Miguel Hidalgo y Costilla International Airport)
Guaymas (General José María Yáñez International Airport)
Hermosillo (General Ignacio Pesqueira Garcia International Airport)
Mazatlán (General Rafael Buelna International Airport)
Puerto Vallarta (Lic. Gustavo Díaz Ordaz International Airport)
San José del Cabo (Los Cabos International Airport)

United States 
Arizona
Phoenix (Sky Harbor International Airport), Hub
Flagstaff (Flagstaff Pulliam Airport)
Lake Havasu City (Lake Havasu City Airport)
Sierra Vista/Fort Huachuca (Sierra Vista Municipal Airport)
Tucson (Tucson International Airport)
Yuma (Yuma International Airport)
America West also previously served Grand Canyon National Park Airport with Dash 8 turboprop aircraft.
California
Bakersfield (Meadows Field Airport)
Burbank (Bob Hope Airport)
Carlsbad (McClellan-Palomar Airport)
Fresno (Fresno Yosemite International Airport)
Long Beach (Long Beach Municipal Airport)
Los Angeles, California (Los Angeles International Airport) Hub
Monterey (Monterey Peninsula Airport)
Oakland (Oakland International Airport)
Ontario (Ontario International Airport)
Palm Springs (Palm Springs International Airport)
Sacramento (Sacramento International Airport)
San Diego (San Diego International Airport)
San Francisco, California (San Francisco International Airport)
San Jose (San Jose International Airport)
San Luis Obispo (San Luis Obispo County Regional Airport)
Santa Ana, Orange County (John Wayne Airport)
Santa Barbara, (Santa Barbara Airport)
Colorado
Aspen (Aspen-Pitkin County Airport)
Colorado Springs (Colorado Springs Airport)
Denver (Denver International Airport)
Durango (Durango-La Plata County Airport)
Grand Junction (Walker Field Airport)
Montrose/Telluride (Montrose Regional Airport) Seasonal
Idaho
Boise (Boise Airport)
Iowa
Des Moines (Des Moines International Airport)
Kansas
Wichita (Wichita Mid-Continent Airport)
Missouri
Kansas City (Kansas City International Airport)
Montana
Billings (Billings Logan International Airport)
Nebraska
Omaha (Eppley Airfield)
Nevada
Las Vegas (McCarran International Airport) Hub
Reno (Reno/Tahoe International Airport)
New Mexico
Albuquerque (Albuquerque International Sunport)
Farmington (Four Corners Regional Airport)
Gallup (Gallup Municipal Airport)
Santa Fe (Santa Fe Municipal Airport)
Oklahoma
Oklahoma City (Will Rogers World Airport)
Oregon
Eugene (Eugene Airport)
Medford (Rogue Valley International-Medford Airport)
Portland (Portland International Airport)
Tennessee
Memphis (Memphis International Airport)
Texas
Austin (Austin-Bergstrom International Airport)
Dallas/Fort Worth (Dallas/Fort Worth International Airport)
El Paso (El Paso International Airport)
 San Antonio International Airport
Utah
 Salt Lake City International Airport
Washington
Seattle/Tacoma (Seattle-Tacoma International Airport)
Spokane (Spokane International Airport)

Lists of airline destinations
America West Holdings